The 1968 season was the Minnesota Vikings' eighth in the National Football League. Under head coach Bud Grant, the Vikings won the NFL Central division title with an 8–6 record, and qualified for the postseason for the first time in franchise history. This was the first of four consecutive division titles for the Vikings. The Vikings' first trip to the playoffs saw them suffer a 24–14 loss in the Western Conference Championship Game to the eventual NFL champion and Super Bowl runner-up Baltimore Colts at Baltimore's Memorial Stadium. In the Playoff Bowl two weeks later, they again lost to the Dallas Cowboys 17–13.

Offseason

1968 Draft

 The New York Giants traded their 1st-round selection (1st overall), 1967 1st-round selection (2nd overall), 1967 2nd-round selection (28th overall), and 1969 2nd-round selection (39th overall) to Minnesota for QB Fran Tarkenton.
 Minnesota traded their 1st-round selection (7th overall) and their 1969 1st-round selection (17th overall) to New Orleans for QB Gary Cuozzo.
 Minnesota traded their 3rd-round selection (61st overall) to PIttsburgh for CB Brady Keys.
 Dallas traded their 3rd-round selection (76th overall) to Minnesota for WR Lance Rentzel.
 Minnesota traded their 5th-round selection (117th overall) to Washington for OL Bob Breitenstein.
 Atlanta traded their 7th-round selection (167th overall) to Minnesota for QB Ron Vander Kelen.
 Detroit traded their 17th-round selection (445th overall) to Minnesota for their 1969 16th-round selection (407th overall).

Roster

Preseason

Regular season

Schedule

Note: The October 6 game against Detroit was originally scheduled to be played in Detroit. The game was switched with the November 17 game due to game 4 of the World Series.

Standings

Playoffs

Statistics

Team leaders

League rankings

References

External links
1968 Minnesota Vikings at Pro-Football-Reference.com

Minnesota Vikings seasons
Minnesota
Minnesota Vikings